BuzzBuzzHome provides an online database for new home construction and residential areas. The company is based in Toronto and has offices in Vancouver,  New York City and Los Angeles.

For consumers, BuzzBuzzHome offers a free wiki-powered database of information regarding new developments in the United States and Canada including pricing, floor plans, renderings, and information on the builder and developer. BuzzBuzzHome also serves as a marketing tool for developers, brokers, and marketing agencies. BuzzBuzzHome employs research staff who update developer pages, and the wiki format of the website allows registered developers to update their own listings directly. For an additional monthly fee, developers can have their projects featured prominently.

History
BuzzBuzzHome was founded in 2009 by Matthew Slutsky and Cliff Peskin in Toronto.

In 2012, the company opened an office in New York City, its first in the United States.

In March 2018, the company launched a platform to sign sales contracts and pay deposits for new home purchases online.

In April 2021, the company was acquired by Zonda Home.

References

External links
 

2009 establishments in Ontario
2021 mergers and acquisitions
Companies based in Toronto
Internet properties established in 2009
Online real estate databases
Real estate companies established in 2009
Real estate valuation
Technology companies of Canada